Yaruu is a sum of Zavkhan Province in western Mongolia. An unpaved road connects Yaruu sum centre to Zavkhanmandal sum. In 2005, its population was 2,547.

References 

Districts of Zavkhan Province